Deltoplastis similella is a moth in the family Lecithoceridae. It was described by Snellen in 1903. It is found on Java.

The wingspan is about 20 mm. The forewings are clay greyish, somewhat lighter and yellower at the margin near the base. The hindwings are brownish grey.

References

Moths described in 1903
Deltoplastis